David Elver "Dave" Maxwell (born October 3, 1943) is the Iowa State Representative from the 76th District.  A Republican, he has served in the Iowa House of Representatives since 2013.

References

1943 births
Living people
People from Poweshiek County, Iowa
Businesspeople from Iowa
Farmers from Iowa
Republican Party members of the Iowa House of Representatives
21st-century American politicians